Depressaria bupleurella is a moth of the family Depressariidae. It is found from Italy, France and Germany east to Poland, Ukraine and Romania.

The larvae feed on Bupleurum falcatum.

References

External links
lepiforum.de

Moths described in 1870
Depressaria
Moths of Europe